Inge Hallgeir Solli (born 10 April 1959) is a Norwegian politician for the Liberal Party.

He served as a deputy representative to the Norwegian Parliament from Akershus during the term 2005–2009.

On the local level, he has been a member of Nittedal municipality council. Following the 2007 elections, Solli became the new deputy county mayor (fylkesvaraordfører) of Akershus.

References

1959 births
Living people
Deputy members of the Storting
Liberal Party (Norway) politicians
Mayors of places in Akershus
People from Nittedal